Claudio Lolli (March 28, 1950 – August 17, 2018) was an Italian singer-songwriter, poet, writer and secondary school teacher.

Career
Claudio Lolli first came to public attention by Francesco Guccini to EMI Italiana, who produced his first LPs from 1972 to 1976. His albums are themed around political issues and ideas. For example, the album Un uomo in crisi follows the events of Antonio Gramsci's life.

Some of his better known songs are "Ho visto anche degli zingari felici", "Aspettando Godot", "Michel", "Quando la morte avrà", "Quanto amore", and "Borghesia".

He started his career as a writer in the early 1980s and wrote five novels. Lolli started writing his first novel, Antipatici antipodi, in 1972, and it was published in 1997.

Discography
Lolli recorded many albums, including:

Albums

Aspettando Godot (1972)
Un uomo in crisi. Canzoni di morte. Canzoni di vita (March 13, 1973)
Canzoni di rabbia (10/2/1975)
Ho visto anche degli zingari felici (7/4/1976)
Disoccupate le strade dai sogni (1977)
Extranei (April 30, 1980)
Antipatici antipodi (1/3/1983)
Claudio Lolli (6/5/1988)
Nove pezzi facili (1992)
Intermittenze del cuore (1997)
Viaggio in Italia (1998)
Dalla parte del torto (2000)
La terra, la luna e l'abbondanza [live] (2002)
Ho visto anche degli zingari felici [live] (4/2003)
La via del mare [live] (October 29, 2005)
La scoperta dell'America (7/4/2006)

45 rpm

Aspettando Godot/Michel (9/11/1972)
Un uomo in crisi/La guerra è finita (May 30, 1973)
Analfabetizzazione/I giornali di marzo (1977)

Anthologies

Piazza... strade... sogni, 1995
Collezione, February 15, 2001
Made in Italy, February 25, 2004
Studio collection, September 23, 2005
Claudio Lolli: the best of platinum, 9/3/2007

Bibliography

L'inseguitore Peter H. – Il lavoro editoriale, 1984
Giochi crudeli – Transeuropa, 1990
Nei sogni degli altri – Marsilio, 1995
Antipatici antipodi – 1972–1997, City lights Italia, 1997
Rumore rosa – Stampa Alternativa, 2004,

References

External links

Semi-official site of Claudio Lolli 
"Brigata Lolli" website 

1950 births
2018 deaths
Italian singer-songwriters
Writers from Bologna
Italian poets
Italian male poets
Musicians from Bologna
Italian schoolteachers